Surasa Mairer (born Paula Mairer, March 6, 1959, in St. Justina, Austria) is an ultra-distance runner. She works as a secretary and lives in Vienna. Surasa is a disciple from the spiritual master Sri Chinmoy.

Biography 
She started running in 1987 at the age of 28 years. Previously, she had not done any sport. "Since then I try the teaching of integral Yoga. A part of this teaching is sporty fitness." In September 1996, she was able to run 700 miles (1126 km).

Wins and Records 
 1999 and 2000 winner of the 1,000-mile-run (1600 km) 
 2000-2003 winner of the Sri Chinmoy Ultra Trio 1000-Mile Race 
 2007 winner of the 10-day run in New York 
 2011 world records in the reverse running of the distances of 5 km, 10 km, half-marathon and marathon
 2011, 2013, 2015 and 2018 winner of the Self-Transcendence 3100 Mile Race.

World Records over 1000 km, 700 miles and 1300 miles.

References

External links 
 Video: Surasa finish 3100-mile race, 2015
 Video: Surasa finish 3100-mile race, 2013
 Video: Surasa finish 3100-mile race, 2011

1959 births
Living people
Austrian sportspeople
Devotees of Sri Chinmoy
Athletes from Vienna